Cha'palaa (also known as Chachi or Cayapa) is a Barbacoan language spoken in northern Ecuador by ca. 9,000 ethnic Chachi people.

"Cha'palaa" means "language of the Chachi people." This language was described in part by the missionary P. Alberto Vittadello, who, by the time his description was published in Guayaquil, Ecuador in 1988, had lived for seven years among the tribe.

Cha'palaa has agglutinative morphology, with a Subject-Object-Verb word order.

Cha'palaa is written using the Latin alphabet, making use of the following graphemes:

A, B, C, CH, D, DY, E, F, G, GU, HU, I, J, L, LL, M, N, Ñ, P, QU, R, S, SH, T, TS, TY, U, V, Y, and '

The writing system includes four simple vowels, and four double vowels:

Phonology 
Cha'palaa has four vowels: /a, e, i, u/. Cha'palaa has 22 consonant phonemes.

References

External links
 Native Languages on Cha'palaachi, with links
 Cayapa (Intercontinental Dictionary Series)

Agglutinative languages
Languages of Ecuador
Barbacoan languages
Endangered Barbacoan languages